Nicolás Bianchi Arce (born 28 January 1987) is an Argentine retired football defender.

Career

San Lorenzo
Bianchi Arce started his professional career in 2006 at San Lorenzo. He made his debut against Independiente and went to become a regular in the San Lorenzo starting eleven. He scored his first goal for San Lorenzo against Tigre and his second against Newell's Old Boys.

In 2007, Bianchi Arce helped San Lorenzo win the Clausura tournament in 2007. He played a total 72 matches for San Lorenzo and scored 2 goals.

AEK Athens
On August 31, 2009, Bianchi Arce joined AEK Athens, on loan for one year with a purchase option of €1.5 million. He became the fifth Argentine AEK Athens player at that moment, the others being Sebastián Saja, Ismael Blanco, Ignacio Scocco and Carlos Araujo. He made his debut against Everton F.C in the UEFA Europa League on September 17, 2009, playing the full 90 minutes.

Olimpo
Bianchi Arce returned to Argentina to play for recently promoted Olimpo for the 2010-11 Argentine Primera División season, on loan from San Lorenzo.

Pescara
On December 19, 2012, he signed for the Italian club Pescara, in Serie A. His transfer had a cost of about €1 million.

Retirement
In the summer 2018 it was confirmed, that Arce had decided to retire.

Honours

References

External links
 Argentine Primera statistics
Statistics at Football-Lineups
Nicolás Bianchi Arce at Soccerway

1987 births
Living people
Footballers from Buenos Aires
Argentine footballers
Argentine expatriate footballers
Association football defenders
Argentine Primera División players
Super League Greece players
Serie A players
Categoría Primera A players
Primera Nacional players
Primera B Metropolitana players
San Lorenzo de Almagro footballers
AEK Athens F.C. players
Olimpo footballers
Delfino Pescara 1936 players
Club Atlético Banfield footballers
Deportivo Cali footballers
Club Atlético Sarmiento footballers
Club Atlético Atlanta footballers
Argentine expatriate sportspeople in Greece
Argentine expatriate sportspeople in Italy
Argentine expatriate sportspeople in Colombia
Expatriate footballers in Greece
Expatriate footballers in Italy
Expatriate footballers in Colombia